WCB may refer to:

Warrnambool Cheese and Butter, an Australian company
Wellington College Belfast, a secondary school in Northern Ireland
West Coast Bancorp, a publicly traded financial services holding company
Westcombe Park railway station, London, England, National Rail station code
Write combining, a computer bus technique
WCB Wasafi, Tanzanian record label

See also
WCBS (disambiguation)